Sandweiler is a commune and town in southern Luxembourg.

Other settlements within the commune include Findel and Birelerhaff.

The commune is dominated by Luxembourg Airport, Luxembourg's only international airport and the fifth-busiest cargo airport in Europe, which lies to the north and west of the town of Sandweiler.  It is also home to the Sandweiler German war cemetery. The commune is surrounded by forests.

Population

Economy
Two airline companies, Luxair and Cargolux, have their head offices on the grounds of Luxembourg Findel Airport in Sandweiler.

DuPont Teijin Films has its headquarters in Sandweiler commune.

A small retail zone can be found Op der Hokaul in the west of the town Sandweiler.

Places of interest

The Sandweiler German war cemetery contains the remnants of around 10900 German servicemen fallen in the Battle of the Bulge. It is over 1 km from the more widely known Luxembourg American Cemetery in Hamm.

References

External links

 
  Commune of Sandweiler official website

 
Communes in Luxembourg (canton)
Towns in Luxembourg